Mounana is a town in Gabon.  It lies on the N3 road and from 1958 until the 1990s was a major uranium mining centre.  The mine is now closed, and it is now primarily a centre for agriculture. According to the 1993 census it had a population of 6,372 and in 2013 it had an estimated population of 12,437.

References

Populated places in Haut-Ogooué Province
Uranium mines
Mining in Gabon